Sir William O'Brien (born 25 January 1929) is a former Labour Party politician in the United Kingdom.

Early life
Born in the historic market town of Pontefract, West Riding of Yorkshire, O'Brien was previously a miner from 1946 to 1983 and local councillor on Wakefield Council from 1973 to 1983. He stood unsuccessfully for the post of Secretary for the Yorkshire region of the National Union of Mineworkers in 1973, losing to Owen Briscoe from the Yorkshire Left group.  He was considered the moderate candidate from the moderate Glasshoughton colliery, whereas Briscoe was a militant from Armthorpe Colliery.

He gained a BEd degree from the University of Leeds in 1978.

Parliamentary career
O'Brien entered the House of Commons as the Member of Parliament for Normanton at the 1983 general election, and re-elected at four further general elections until he retired at the 2005 general election. He served as both an Opposition Spokesman on Environment (1987–92) and Opposition Spokesman on Northern Ireland (1992–94).

He was named a Knight Bachelor in the 2010 Dissolution Honours.

Personal life
He married Jean Scofield, and the couple had three daughters.

Bibliography
The Prince of Wales Colliery

References

External links
 They Work for You

1929 births
Living people
Labour Party (UK) MPs for English constituencies
English people of Irish descent
Alumni of the University of Leeds
Politicians from Pontefract
UK MPs 1983–1987
UK MPs 1987–1992
UK MPs 1992–1997
UK MPs 1997–2001
UK MPs 2001–2005
Knights Bachelor
Councillors in Wakefield
Politicians awarded knighthoods